Live at Slugs' is a live album by American jazz trumpeter-composer Charles Tolliver and his quarter Music Inc. It was recorded in 1970 and released by Strata-East Records as two volumes in 1972.

Reception

The Allmusic review by Scott Yanow awarded the album 4½ stars stating "The music straddles the boundary between advanced hard bop and the avant-garde and rewards repeated listenings".

Track listing
All compositions by Charles Tolliver except as indicated

Volume I
 "Drought" - 9:04
 "Felicite" (Cecil McBee) - 8:05
 "Orientale" (Stanley Cowell) - 17:32

Volume II
 "Spanning" - 8:30
 "Wilpan's" (McBee) -10:37
 "Our Second Father (Dedicated to the Memory of John Coltrane)" - 13:26

Personnel
Charles Tolliver - trumpet
Stanley Cowell - piano
Cecil McBee - bass
Jimmy Hopps - drums

References

1970 live albums
Charles Tolliver live albums
Strata-East Records live albums